Kordia zhangzhouensis is a Gram-negative, aerobic, rod-shaped and non-motile bacterium from the genus Kordia which has been isolated from surface freshwater from the Jiulong River in China.

References

Flavobacteria
Bacteria described in 2015